Leon Žitnik is a retired Yugoslav slalom canoeist who competed from the late 1950s to the mid-1960s. He won a silver medal in the C-2 team event with his brother Franc at the 1965 ICF Canoe Slalom World Championships in Spittal.

References

Yugoslav male canoeists
Possibly living people
Year of birth missing (living people)
Medalists at the ICF Canoe Slalom World Championships